Chemmalamattam, (otherwise known as Chemmalamattom) is a village in the Kottayam district of Kerala, India. It is located about 40 km east of Kottayam and 19 km west of Mundakkayam and is 9.5 km north of Kanjirappally towards Erattupetta.

Location
The village headquarters is at Kondoor, the taluk headquarters is located at Meenachil, and the district headquarters at Kottayam. This village is part of the Poonjar Legislative Assembly and Pathanamthitta LokSabha constituency. Local people mostly work as farmers, cultivating cash crops such as rubber and cocoa, and agricultural crops such as cassava and plantain.

Transportation
The nearest railway stations are at Kottayam (40 km), Changanacherry (43 km) or Ettumanoor (30 km). The nearest airport, Cochin International Airport is 66 km away.

Landmarks
Locally, the XII Apostles' Church is a Roman Catholic church.

How to Reach
 Thiruvananthapuram - Kottarakkara - Adoor - Pathanamthitta - Ranni - Erumeli - Kanjirappally - Chemmalamattam
 Kottayam - Ettumanoor - Pala - Erattupetta - Chemmalamattam
 Kochi/Cochin - Trhippunithura - Poothotta - Thalayolapparambu - Ettumanoor - Pala - Erattupetta - Chemmalamattam

References

Villages in Kottayam district